The desert plated lizard (Gerrhosaurus skoogi) is a reptile species endemic to the northern Namib Desert in Namibia and Angola. Also known as the sand plated lizard, it is diurnal.

Etymology
The specific name, skoogi, is in honor of Hilmer Nils Erik Skoog (1870–1927), who was Curator of the Götesborgs Naturhistoriska museum from 1904 to 1927.

Taxonomy
In 1916 Andersson described this lizard as a new species, naming it Gerrhosaurus skoogi. In 1953  FitzSimons assigned the species to a new genus Angolosaurus. Recent studies suggest that this monotypic genus is synonymous to Gerrhosaurus and makes it paraphyletic; therefore A. skoogi was reclassified as Gerrhosaurus skoogi.

References

Further reading
Andersson LG (1916). "Notes on the reptiles and batrachians in the Zoological museum at Gothenburg with an account of some new species". Göteborgs Kungliga Vetenskaps och Vitter-Hets Samhalles Handlingar, Series B, 4, 17 (5): 1-41. (Gerrhosaurus skoogi, new species).
Branch, Bill (2004). Field Guide to Snakes and other Reptiles of Southern Africa. Third Revised edition, Second Impression. Sanibel Island, Florida: Ralph Curtis Books. 399 pp. . (Angolosaurus skoogi, p. 177 + Plate 64).

Gerrhosaurus
Reptiles described in 1916
Lizards of Africa
Reptiles of Angola
Endemic fauna of Angola
Taxa named by Lars Gabriel Andersson